Kadhal Parisu is a 1987 Indian Tamil-language film directed by A. Jagannathan, starring Kamal Haasan, Ambika and Radha. The film was released on 14 January 1987, Pongal day and became commercial success.

Plot 
The movie starts with Mohan getting released from prison after serving a sentence on a rape charge. Malini and Chitra are sisters and heirs to a wealthy business. Malini looks after the business after their parents died while Chitra is a student. Mohan meets Chitra and soon they fall in love, while Malini has sworn off all men. Malini and Chithra’s uncle is after their wealth.

When Chitra brings Mohan home to meet her sister, Mohan and Malini have a big fight which ends in Malini forbidding Chitra from seeing Mohan. Malini then reveals the reason behind the fight. Years earlier, Mohan and Malini were classmates, Malini had a crush on him which Mohan never reciprocated. While on a class trip, Malini gives a note to Mohan that asks him to meet her in his room. Malini claims that, that night, Mohan entered her room and they had consensual sex, but Mohan denied it and refused to marry her. So she bought up rape charges against him and sent him to prison.

The truth comes out. During the class trip, Mohan never received the note which fell on Kailash's brother, Anand, who was their classmate. Anand, lusting after Malini, uses this opportunity to enter Malini's room on the pretext of being Mohan and has sex with her. Since Anand disconnected the electricity in her room and the room was very dark, Malini didn't know the difference as she was drugged by Anand because he mixed a pill in her softdrink at the party. Malini shoots Anand for his act and also herself as she cannot live the rest of her life with the guilt. Mohan forgives Malini and Malini gives her daughter as her gift to Mohan and she dies in Mohan's arms.

Cast 
 Kamal Haasan as Mohan
 Ambika as Malini
 Radha as Chitra
Poornam Viswanathan as Malini's father
 Rajkumar Sethupathi as Anand
 Jaishankar as Kailash
 Janagaraj as Malini's uncle
 Delhi Ganesh as Inspector
Ravi Raghavendra as K. K. Bahadur
 Sivaraman
 Jeevan
 Kovai Sarala as Kanmani
 Disco Shanti
 Baby Sujitha
 T. K. S. Natarajan

Soundtrack 
The music was composed by Ilaiyaraaja. The song "Purakkale Purakkale" was originally composed and picturised for Bharathiraja's shelved film Top Tucker.

References

External links 

1980s Tamil-language films
1987 films
Films directed by A. Jagannathan
Films scored by Ilaiyaraaja